The tzangion, plural tzangia was a type of boot or sandal, which in the Middle Ages became an important part of the Byzantine Emperors' regalia.

Thus the first occurrence of the {transl|grc|tzangia}} as a sign of royal power is in John Malalas' description of the coronation of Tzath I as king of Lazica under Justin I, where Tzath was dressed in Roman imperial garb, but wore , decorated with pearls "in the Persian manner", rather than the Roman emperor's . By the 9th century, the wearing of red  had become firmly associated with the imperial office, so much so that rebels putting them on signified their usurpation of the imperial title.

References

Sources

Further reading 
 

Byzantine regalia
Boots
Roman–Iranian relations